Hunjan is a surname found among Punjabi Rajput and Mohyal Brahmins originating from Hunejan, Iran and who settled in the Salt Range and Majha regions of Punjab.

Migrants, traders, merchants and nomadic tribes, coming from Hunejan, Iran to the Punjab region assimilated into the Rajput and Mohyal communities during medieval India. This led to the migrants adopting new beliefs; however, they retained their surnames - coming from the migrants' ancestral village in Iran. Modern day descendants can trace their origin to Iranian and Indo-Aryan roots.

Notable people with the surname
 Amrita Hunjan, British model and singer
 Jason Hunjan, British stunt actor
 Gian Hunjan, American comedy writer and creator of BroScienceLife and Mike&Gian
 Surjit Patar, Indian poet and writer

References 

Indian surnames